The Chenab valley in Jammu and Kashmir has high tourism potential. There are a number of tourist attractions with history and traditions. It consists of;

Natural tourist destination

Kishtwar district
Sinthan Top, a mountain pass in Kishtwar district connecting Anantnag district.
Marwah valley, a far-flung region located in Kishtwar district.
Warwan Valley, located in Kishtwar district passing Marusudar River.
Paddar, a remote valley in Kishtwar district.
Tatta Pani is known for its natural Hot spring in Paddar area of Kishtwar. There is a waterfall 'Hanswar Fall'.
Chowgan Ground, a large ground in Kishtwar.
Bimalnag, a tourist attraction covered with forests in the upper reaches of Drabshalla in Kishtwar district.

Doda district
Bhal Padri, large evergreen meadows in Bhalessa.
Padri Pass, a mountain pass in on Bhaderwah-Chamba road in Bhaderwah.
Jai valley, a valley with a stream flowing between meadows in Bhaderwah.
Jantroon Dhar, a long meadow in Thathri sub division.
Chinta valley, a tourist destination in Bhaderwah.
Bhaderwah, is a tourist destination in Chenab valley.
Lal Draman, a tourist attraction in Doda district
Jantroon Dhar, a long meadow spread over three sub districts of Doda district.

Ramban district
Sanasar, a tourist attraction in Ramban district.
Gool, a tourist destination in Ramban district.
Banihal Pass, a mountain pass in Ramban district connecting Kashmir valley.

Adventure tourist destination
Shibnote, a whitewater rafting point in Chenab river.

Monuments and religious places
Kishtwar Fort, a historical fort in Kishtwar town.
Bhaderwah Fort, (now used as Jail) is a significant historical fort located in Bhaderwah.
Shrine of Farid-ud-Din Baghdadi in Kishtwar district.
Mata Sarthal Devi Mandir in Sarthal area of Kishtwar district.
Machail Mata, located in Paddar of Kishtwar district.

Wildlife sanctuaries and National parks
Kishtwar National Park, located 40 kms from Kishtwar.

Dams and Hydroelectric projects
Dul Hasti Hydroelectric Plant, a 390 MW hydroelectric project in Kishtwar district.
Baglihar Dam, a 900MW hydroelectric project in Ramban district.
Ratle Hydroelectric Plant, a 850MW hydropower project in Kishtwar district.
Pakal Dul Dam, a 1000MW hydroelectric project in Kishtwar district.

See also
Tourism in Jammu and Kashmir.

References

Tourist attractions in Jammu and Kashmir
Economy of Jammu and Kashmir